Ophyx triangulata is a moth of the family Erebidae. It is found in Indonesia (Batchian).

References

Ophyx
Moths described in 1984
Moths of Indonesia